The Canton of Montlieu-la-Garde is a former canton of the Charente-Maritime department, in France. It was disbanded following the French canton reorganisation which came into effect in March 2015. It consisted of 13 communes, which joined the new canton of Les Trois Monts in 2015. It had 6,813 inhabitants (2012). The lowest point is about 50 m in the commune of Bussac-Forêt, the highest point is Chevanceaux at 158 m, and the average elevation is 98 m. The most populous commune was Montlieu-la-Garde with 1,329 residents (2012).

Communes

The canton comprised the following communes:

Bedenac
Bussac-Forêt
Chatenet
Chepniers
Chevanceaux
Mérignac
Montlieu-la-Garde
Orignolles
Le Pin
Polignac
Pouillac
Sainte-Colombe
Saint-Palais-de-Négrignac

Population history

See also 
 Cantons of the Charente-Maritime department

References

Montlieu-la-Garde
2015 disestablishments in France
States and territories disestablished in 2015